Nerse, also known as Nersa, is a village located in Khanapur Taluk of Belagavi District, Karnataka, India. It is also the headquarters for Nerse Gram Panchayat. The distance from Belagavi is about 40 km and from Bengaluru is 500 km. This beautiful village is situated under the Western Ghats, on the boundary of Karnataka and Goa. It is a verdant land of agriculture where sugarcane, paddy and groundnut cultivations are plenty.
It is a part of the proposed Bhimgarh Sanctuary and is a heavily forested area. Apart from resident birds, it is also home to many migratory species such as the Ceylon frogmouth and the paradise flycatcher. The forest of Nerse, apart from being home to many wild animals, is also home to bats in the Talvedi region and the Krishnapur area of Mahadai Valley. The Barapedi cave in the Londa Forest is home to more than 200 bats. There are more than 40 species of bats live in Nerse. Close to Nerse, there is the nature bound place of Dandeli Wildlife Sanctuary which is famous for its herd of elephants.

Activities to do 

Trekking

Bird Watching

Jungle Safari

How to reach Nerse 

By Air

Bangalore international airport is around 505 km from Nerse.
Sambre Airport   41 km     
Dabolim Airport   74 km     
Hubli Airport     84 km near     
Kolhapur Airport  134 km near 

By Train

Belgaum is the nearest railhead to Nerse.
Khanapur Railway Station - 15 km
Londa Junction Rail Way Station 27 km     
Castle Rock Rail Way Station 40 km     

By Road

Nerse is well connected by number of bus services to reach nearby cities of Karnataka.

Weather 

In summer 23-35°C and in winter 13-20°C.

Nearby Other Tourist Places 

Dandeli   48 km
Amboli   68 km
Goa   72 km

Nearby major Cities 
Mumbai  462 km near     
Bangalore  511 km near     
Hyderabad  535 km near

Nearby Local Cities 
Belgaum  35 km near     
Ichalkaranji  138 km near     
Kolhapur  140 km near     
Sangli  159 km near

Nearby Districts 
Belgaum   34 km near     
South Goa   67 km near     
North Goa   72 km near     
Dharwad   73 km near

References

 http://www.bangaloretourism.org/wildlife-nersa.php
 https://www.nativeplanet.com/nersa/

Villages in Belagavi district